Lygodactylus ocellatus , also known as the ocellated dwarf gecko or spotted dwarf gecko, is a species of gecko endemic to South Africa and Eswatini.

References

Lygodactylus
Reptiles of South Africa
Reptiles of Eswatini
Reptiles described in 1907
Taxa named by Jean Roux